Lucban, officially the Municipality of Lucban, is a 2nd class municipality in the province of Quezon, Philippines. According to the 2020 census, it has a population of 53,091 people.

Lucban is dubbed as the Art Capital, Dance Capital, and Rice Capital of Quezon province.

The municipality is known for its annual Pahiyas Festival, which is held every May 19 in honor of San Isidro Labrador and known also as the 'Baguio' counterpart of Quezon, Province.

Etymology
Legend - poetically in "Ode to Lucban" - has it the town derives its name from the lukbán or pomelo tree. Three hunters from neighbouring Majayjay— namely Marcos Tigla, Luis Gamba and Lucas Mañawa— lost their way following the trail of wild animals at the foot of volcanic Mount Banahaw. Resting under a tree, they saw a crow (uwák) in the tree's branches, and believing this to be a bad omen, they moved to another place and rested again. Whilst in the shade of a large pomelo (lucbán) tree, the trio were attracted to a couple of kingfishers (salacsác) that were singing. Fascinated by the bird's plumage and rhythmic chirps, the superstitious hunters took this a sign of good fortune and thus settled in the place they named "Lucbán."

History

Second World War and Japanese Occupation
Early in the campaign, Japanese forces invaded and occupied Lucban. On December 26, 1941, Filipino and American troops defended Barrio Piis and the attack by the Japanese shifted to the Bataan Peninsula. After Japanese forces occupied the town, they built a military garrison and Japanese armed forces were stationed in Lucban. Both local guerrilla and regular troops of the Philippine Commonwealth Army initiated attacks in Lucban from 1942 to 1945.

Sampaloc, Quezon
Sampaloc used to be the Barrio Dingin of Lucban, Quezon consisting of three sitios. It was later renamed into Sampaloc because of the presence of a large tamarind tree found in the center of the settlement during the earlier days. The name was also changed in Alfonso Trece for a time to honor the King of Spain. In 1873, Capt. Pedro Cadelina of Lucban recommended to change the barrio into a municipality but due to lack of residents, it was only made into a “visita”. “Teniente Mayores” were appointed to head the ”visita”, the first of whom was from Polilio, followed by Arcadio Veluya, Laureano Nanola, Silverio Abueva and Juan Saludades. Through the efforts of Juan Pineda, Sampaloc became a municipality in 1892. He was elected as the first Capitan. He was succeeded by Diego Gagan followed by Teofilo Daya in 1901. During Daya's term in the office, three more barrios from Mauban – Banot, Bilucao and San Bueno, became a part of Sampaloc through the efforts of Ireneo Domeo, the municipal secretary. The town was also renamed to Sampaloc during this time.

Geography

Barangays
Lucban is politically subdivided into 32 barangays.

Climate

Demographics

Economy

Government

Elected officials
Municipal council (2022-2025):

Culture

Pahiyas festival

Lucban celebrates the Pahiyas Festival every May 15 in honor of the patron saint of farmers, St Isidore the Labourer. Beginning with a 6:00am mass at the Lucban Church, this festival showcases a street of houses which are adorned with fruits, vegetables, agricultural products, handicrafts and kiping, a rice-made decoration, which afterwards can be eaten grilled or fried. The houses are judged and the best one is proclaimed the winner. Every year, tourists roam the municipality to witness the decoration of houses. Nowadays, Pahiyas Festival is a week long celebration starting every May 15.

Education
Public Research University
 Southern Luzon State University

College:
 Our Lady of the Most Holy Rosary Seminary
 Banahaw Technological College

Secondary Schools:
 Casa del Niño Jesus de Lucban - High School
 Banahaw View Academy
 Lucban Academy
 One in Christ Church School of Lucban Inc.
 Paaralang Sekundarya ng Lucban Integrated School
 Nagsinamo National High School
 Lucban Christian School - Junior High School

Elementary Schools:
 Steadfast Love Kiddie School
 Casa Del Niño Jesus de Lucban
 Good Shepherd Diocesan School-Philippine Independent Church
 Paaralang Elementarya ng Lucban 1
 Paaralang Elementarya ng Lucban 2
 Paaralang Elementarya ng Lucban 3A
 Paaralang Elementarya ng Lucban 3B
 Paaralang Elementarya ng Lucban 4
 Paaralang Elementarya ng Lucban 5
 Paaralang Elementarya ng Lucban 6
 Paaralang Elementarya ng Lucban 7
 Paaralang Elementarya ng Lucban-Maka
 Paaralang Elementarya ng Lucban-May-it Manasa
 Paaralang Elementarya ng Lucban-Nagsinamo
 Paaralang Elementarya ng Lucban-Nakal
 Paaralang Elementarya ng Lucban-Piis
 Lucban Adventist Elementary School
 Lucban Christian School

Religious landmarks

 Saint Louis Bishop Parish (Lucban Church)
 Kamay ni Hesus Shrine

Notable people

 Hermano Pule, religious leader who founded and led the Cofradía de San José.
 Angel Lagdameo, Archbishop of the Archdiocese of Jaro and former President of the Catholic Bishops' Conference of the Philippines 
 Tommy Abuel,  actor
 Pauline Mendoza, actress and model of GMA Network
 Leo Oracion, first Filipino mountaineer to successfully reach the Mt. Everest summit 
 Adrian L. Policena, also known as Chris Tsuper, popular radio personality

References

22. Wikipedia Chris Tsuper

External links

Lucban Profile at PhilAtlas.com
[ Philippine Standard Geographic Code]
Philippine Census Information
Local Governance Performance Management System
Quezon Province Web Portal
Ode to Lucban

Municipalities of Quezon
Populated places established in 1578